Petra Kvitová was the defending champion, but withdrew before her first match due to a gastrointestinal illness.

Svetlana Kuznetsova won the title, defeating Monica Puig in the final, 6–0, 6–2.

Seeds
The top two seeds received a bye into the second round.

Draw

Finals

Top half

Bottom half

Qualifying

Seeds

Qualifiers

Lucky losers

Draw

First qualifier

Second qualifier

Third qualifier

Fourth qualifier

References
 Main Draw
 Qualifying Draw

W